Amnuay Silpa School is a coeducational private school in Bangkok, Thailand. It teaches kindergarten, primary and secondary levels. The school was founded in 1926, formerly as an all-boy school in the early years.  Chitra Dansuputra was the co-founder and the owner of the school.  He later set up a non-profit educational trust Amnuay Silpa Foundation and donated the school to the foundation in 1960.

At its peak, the school had a student body of 7,000, but has since scaled down to about 1,500. Its alumni include six prime ministers of Thailand: Kriangsak Chamanan, Chatichai Choonhavan, Anand Panyarachun, Suchinda Kraprayoon, Chavalit Yongchaiyudh and Somchai Wongsawat.

References

External links
 

Schools in Bangkok
Educational institutions established in 1926
1926 establishments in Siam
Ratchathewi district